The Health Insurance Organisation is a state agency which runs the healthcare system in Cyprus.  It manages a budget of €1 billion which pays for the Gesy system.

It negotiates with the Cyprus Medical Association.

It was criticised by the official audit in 2018 which said that “Execution of important projects that are necessary for the implementation of the Gesy like reorganization/autonomy of state hospitals, which should have been handled as a matter of priority have been greatly delayed.”  No criteria were in place for selecting overseas centres to which patients would be sent for treatments not available on the island. Most patients were sent to UK, Germany, Greece, and Israel but the financial arrangements were unsatisfactory. In 2016  276 patients were sent to Germany at a cost of about €5.2 million, and 426 to Greece at a cost of about €3 million. 

The law prohibits private doctors treating Gesy patients in hospitals that are contracted to the organisation, though since 2020 it has turned a blind eye to this unlawful practice.  It is alleged that it is accountable to nobody because everyone supports Gesy and credits the organisation for its operation and that private hospitals outside Gesy are squeezed by this powerful monopoly, until they are also forced to join.

References

Medical and health organisations based in Cyprus
Health insurance